Idiotipula is a genus of true crane fly.

Distribution
South Africa

Species
I. confluens Alexander, 1921

References

Tipulidae
Diptera of Africa